Janet Amos (born 12 September 1944) is a Canadian theatre actress, director, educator and playwright.

The daughter of the actress Beth Amos, Janet has led theatre companies as the artistic director of the Blyth Festival (1979-1984 and 1994-1997) and Theatre New Brunswick (1984-1988). She worked as an assistant professor of the University of Regina (2003-2006), as a guest artist at the University of Ottawa (2008) and as instructor at the National Theatre School of Canada in Montreal.

Amos is credited as leading an effort to save the Blyth Festival from closure, when she took over as the artistic director in 1994. Prior to her assuming the role of artistic director, the Blyth Festival had lost thousands of audience members and amassed a $229,000 debt. Amos' drove a fundraising campaign that raised more than $100,000 and created a season line-up that brought audiences back, helping the summer theatre to survive.

Amos has also directed theatre productions at Toronto's Theatre Passe Muraille, Port Dover's Lighthouse Theatre, Regina's Globe Theatre, London, Ontario's Grand Theatre, Edmonton's Citadel Theatre and Ottawa's National Arts Centre, among others. 

Amos has appeared as an actor in the Canadian films Winter Kept Us Warm (1965), High (1969), Silence of the North (1981), Taking Care (1987), and More than Meets the Eye: The Joan Brock Story (2003). TV show guest acting credits include Ada (1976), Road to Avonlea (1992), Twice in a Lifetime (2000), and PSI Factor: Chronicles of the Paranormal (2000).

Amos' work has been recognized through various awards. The village of Blyth, Ontario gave her a Citizen of the Year Award in 1994, the University of Western Ontario awarded her an honorary degree in 1998 and  the Association for Canadian Theatre Research made her an honorary member in 2005.

She is married to Canadian playwright Ted Johns.

References

External links 
 

1944 births
Living people
Canadian theatre directors
Canadian television actresses
Canadian stage actresses
Canadian women dramatists and playwrights
20th-century Canadian dramatists and playwrights
20th-century Canadian actresses
20th-century Canadian women writers
21st-century Canadian dramatists and playwrights
21st-century Canadian actresses
21st-century Canadian women writers
Academic staff of the National Theatre School of Canada
Academic staff of the University of Regina
Canadian artistic directors